The men's doubles competition in badminton at the 2015 Southeast Asian Games is being held from 13 to 16 June 2015 at the Singapore Indoor Stadium in Kallang, Singapore.

Schedule
All times are Singapore Standard Time (UTC+08:00)

Results

References

External links 

Men's doubles